Midi Libre is a French daily newspaper in Montpellier that covers general news.  It began publication in 1944.

Since 1949, the newspaper has organised a cycling stage race, the Grand Prix du Midi Libre.

References

External links
 Website
 Midi Libre – Mondo Times
 Three "Midi Libre" reporters under judicial investigation over leaked audit, 1 December 2006

1944 establishments in France
Mass media in Montpellier
Daily newspapers published in France
Publications established in 1944